Adam Crooks may refer to:

Adam Crooks (politician), Canada
Adam Crooks (activist), Wesleyan Methodist minister